Charmaine Pereira is a writer and feminist scholar in Abuja, Nigeria. Her work centers on feminist thought, sexuality, gender education, and civil society and the state. Pereira is also a coordinator for the Initiative for Women’s Studies in Nigeria. She is a member of Tapestry Consulting, an organization that seeks to create gender equality in the workplace in Africa.

Biography 
In 1991, Pereira received a Ph.D. in Psychology of Education from The Open University.

In 2004, Charmaine Pereira co-edited Jacketed Women: Qualitative Research Methodologies on Sexualities and Gender in Africa with Jane Bennett.

Pereira currently teaches in the Sociology department at Ahmadu Bello University. Her work explores the challenges that a researcher encounters when interrogating the intersectionality of culture, gender, sexuality, law, and religion.

Selected publications 
 Pereira, Charmaine. Gender in the Making of the Nigerian University System. James Currey, 2007.
 Pereira, Charmaine, editor. Changing Narratives of Sexuality: Contestations, Compliance and Women’s Empowerment. London, New York: Zed Books, 2014.
 Bennett, Jane, and Charmaine Pereira, editors. Jacketed Women: Qualitative Research Methodologies on Sexualities and Gender in Africa. Tokyo, New York, Paris: United Nations University Press, 2013.
 Pereira, Charmaine. “Domesticating Women? Gender, Religion and the State in Nigeria Under Colonial and Military Rule.” African Identities 3.1 (2005): 69-94.

References

Other sources 
 http://zedbooks.co.uk/paperback/changing-narratives-of-sexuality
 

Year of birth missing (living people)
Living people
Nigerian writers
Nigerian women writers
Alumni of the Open University